Oasis is an unincorporated community in Mono County, California. Oasis is at the junction of California State Route 266 and California State Route 168. The 2000 Census reports that Oasis had a population of 22.

A post office operated at Oasis from 1873 to 1942.

References

Unincorporated communities in California
Unincorporated communities in Mono County, California